Scythris trivinctella, the banded scythris moth, is a moth of the family Scythrididae. It is found in North America, where it has been recorded from New England to Florida, the Great Plains states, Texas to Arizona and south into Mexico, Utah, eastern Oregon and north into southern British Columbia.

The wingspan is 11–12 mm. The forewings are dark brownish-gray with a broad white diagonal antemedial line and oblique postmedial line that divides into a Y-shape at the inner margin. The hindwings are uniform dark.

The larvae feed on Amaranthus hybridus.

References

Moths described in 1873
trivinctella